Wang Lei (born December 26, 1977, in Daxing'anling, Heilongjiang) is a Chinese professional Go player.

Biography 
Lei started to learn Go a little late in Eastern terms, at the age of 9. Lei became a pro in 1989 when he was just 12 years old. He has risen up the ranks and currently sits at 8 dan. He is a disciple of Nie Weiping.

References

Titles & runners-up 

1977 births
Living people
Chinese Go players
People from Daxing'anling
Sportspeople from Heilongjiang